Storyteller is a compilation album from Scottish singer-songwriter Donovan. It was released on 16 September 2003 (Audio Fidelity 015) and was the first Donovan album released as a Super Audio CD/CD hybrid.

History

In 2003, Audio Fidelity issued a compilation consisting chiefly of Donovan's 1965 Pye Records recordings, but also secured the right to add his Epic Records recordings of "Sunshine Superman", "Mellow Yellow", "Hurdy Gurdy Man" and "Atlantis".  All of the songs were remastered for both the CD and Super Audio CD layers by Steve Hoffman.  In 2006, MsMusic Productions reissued this album on 33 rpm vinyl record with a few additional tracks from the Pye Records years, the 4 Epic Records tracks on a bonus 45rpm EP and different artwork as pictured on the right, below.

Track listing
All tracks by Donovan Leitch, except where noted.

CD/SACD version

"Catch the Wind"
"Colours"
"Universal Soldier" (Buffy Sainte-Marie)
"Josie"
"Sunny Goodge Street"
"Hey Gyp (Dig the Slowness)"
"Turquoise"
"You're Gonna Need Somebody on Your Bond" (traditional; arranged by Donovan Leitch)
"To Try for the Sun"
"To Sing for You"
"Sunshine Superman"
"Mellow Yellow"
"Hurdy Gurdy Man"
"Atlantis"

Vinyl version on MsMusic Productions

Side One 
Catch the Wind
Colours (hit version)
Universal Soldier
Josie
Sunny Goodge Street
Turquoise

Side Two
Hey Gyp (Dig the Slowness)
You're Gonna Need Somebody on Your Bond
To Try for the Sun
To Sing for You
Jersey Thursday
Colours (album version)

Bonus 45rpm that comes with vinyl version

Side 1:
Sunshine Superman
Mellow Yellow

Side 2:
Hurdy Gurdy Man
Atlantis

External links
 Storyteller – Donovan Unofficial Site

Albums produced by Mickie Most
2003 compilation albums
Donovan compilation albums